Andy Thomson may refer to:
Andy Thomson (Scottish footballer) (born 1971), former Scottish football player for Queen of the South, Southend United, Oxford United, Gillingham, QPR, Partick Thistle, Falkirk and Stenhousemuir 
Andy Thomson (English footballer) (born 1974), former English football player for Swindon, Portsmouth, Bristol Rovers and Wycombe Wanderers
J. Anderson Thomson, psychiatrist noted for work in evolutionary psychology
Andy Thomson (bowls) (born 1955), lawn and indoor bowler
Andy R. Thomson, Canadian architect and environmentalist

See also
Andrew Thomson (disambiguation)
Andrew Thompson (disambiguation)